The Down county football team represents Down GAA, the county board of the Gaelic Athletic Association, in the Gaelic sport of football. The team competes in three major annual inter-county competitions; the All-Ireland Senior Football Championship, the Ulster Senior Football Championship and the National Football League.

Down's home ground is Páirc Esler, Newry. The team's manager is Conor Laverty.

The team last won the Ulster Senior Championship in 1994, the All-Ireland Senior Championship in 1994 and the National League in 1983.

With just one loss in six appearances in All-Ireland SFC finals, Down has a reputation for rising to the big occasion. Kitted out in distinctive red and black, the team's massive fan base has been responsible for some of the largest match attendances in GAA history. Although, since the last decade of the twentieth century, the team has had a barren patch at senior level, despite various successes at underage level, in 2010 Down showed signs of improving by gaining promotion to the National Football League Division One and reaching the All-Ireland Senior Football final — narrowly losing by one point to Cork.

History

1950s–1960s
Down was not regarded as a football stronghold when Queen's University won the 1958 Sigerson Cup, and some of its leading players turned their thoughts to Down's county team dilemma.

Down won the 1959 Ulster Senior Football Championship (SFC) title with six inter-changeable forwards who introduced off-the-ball running and oddities such as track-suits.

In 1960, two goals in a three-minute period from James McCartan and Paddy Doherty helped Down to defeat Kerry, who were almost completely unbeaten at the time, and which brought to an end the Kerry football regime for a few years.

In 1961, Down defeated Offaly by one point in a game that featured five first half goals. In that three-year period their supporters surpassed every attendance record in the book. When Down played Offaly in 1961 they set a record attendance of 90,556 for a GAA game. Against Dublin in the 1964 National League final a record crowd of 70,125 attended. The 71,573 who watched Down play Kerry in 1961 still stands as a record for an All-Ireland SFC semi-final. In 1968, Down defeated Kerry with Sean O'Neill and John Murphy goals, again in a two-minute spell. Despite a famous prediction that Down would go on to win three-in-a-row, the county took twenty years to regain its status.

1970s–1980s

1990s
In 1991, Down surprised favourites Meath, Barry Breen scoring the goal that sent his team into a lead of eleven points with twenty minutes to go, a lead that Meath could not match. In 1994, Mickey Linden sent James McCartan in for a goal directly under Hill 16, a goal which silenced Dublin and helped Down claim its fifth All-Ireland SFC title.

No other team from Ulster won an All-Ireland SFC until Armagh won the 2002 All-Ireland Senior Football Championship Final.

2000s–present
In 2008, Down defeated Tyrone after a replay in the Ulster SFC but lost to Armagh in the Ulster SFC semi-final. Down advanced to play Offaly in the All-Ireland SFC qualifiers. After a convincing 5–19 to 2–10 victory over Offaly, Down faced Laois in a Round 2 qualifier. Defeating Laois by a single point, and with Dan Gordon being sent off, Down progressed to the last round of the qualifiers, in which the team was paired with Wexford, a game held at Croke Park. Down had Dan Gordon's suspension removed, but awful conditions and a poor Down performance resulted in a defeat to Wexford by a scoreline of 2–13 to 0–12.

Down reached the 2010 All-Ireland SFC Final after a narrow win over Kildare in the semi-final. However, Down lost to Cork in that game, the first time Down experienced defeat in an All-Ireland SFC final. Cork trailed by three points at half-time but improved in the second half and won by a scoreline of 0–16 to 0–15. Down captain Benny Coulter's effort on 70 minutes and a fisted Daniel Hughes effort one minute into added time left one point between the teams. That was the way it stayed, as Cork collected its seventh All-Ireland SFC crown in front of a crowd of 81,604.

In 2019, Down won the U20 Leo Murphy Cup Football Development League, defeating Cavan in the final by a scoreline of 1–14 to 0–11.

Style of play
Down teams through the years have played with great emphasis on attack, often leading to the neglect of the defence. This system has cost Down teams of the twenty-first century, with the introduction of more negative tactics to quell forward lines, with a massive emphasis on blanket defence.

Current panel

Current management team
Manager: Conor Laverty, appointed 8 August 2022
Backroom team: Martin Clarke, Declan Morgan and one other.

Managerial history
As late as 2012, Down had a history of not appointing "foreign" managers, though Martin Breheny suggested Down might be the most likely from the cohort of football teams that traditionally appointed a manager from inside to ask for "outside help". Since then, the county has recruited Jim McCorry and Paddy Tally from outside.

Players

Notable players

Records
 Seán O'Neill – Down's only representative on the Gaelic Football Team of the Millennium
 Kevin Mussen – from the Clonduff club, the first Down man to lift the Sam Maguire Cup in 1960
 Paddy Doherty – All-Ireland SFC winning captain 1961
 Joe Lennon – All-Ireland SFC winning captain 1968
 Patsy O'Hagan – All-Ireland SFC winner (1960 and 1961) and selector for 1968 All-Ireland SFC winning team
 Paddy O'Rourke – All-Ireland SFC winning captain 1991 and former Down senior football manager
 James McCartan Jnr – All-Ireland SFC winner in 1991 and 1994, All Star (1990 and 1994), managed Queen's University to the 2007 Sigerson Cup.
 D. J. Kane – All-Ireland SFC winning captain 1994 and former assistant county manager with Down.
 Ambrose Rogers – from the Longstone club, was captain in 2010 but was injured before the All-Ireland SFC Final
 Benny Coulter – half-forward and Ireland international, All Star (2010)
 Dan Gordon – midfielder from the Loughinisland Club, captain of the Down senior team in 2007–08. In 2010, Gordon played in defence.
 Brendan McVeigh – An Ríocht, All-Ireland SFC winner and All Star in 2010. Down GAA First Division winner 2007. Only Down goalkeeper to have won an All Star.
 Martin Clarke – An Ríocht, won an All-Ireland MFC medal in 2005 and an All Star in 2010, in between which played for AFL club Collingwood Magpies.
 Patrick Kielty – comedian, All-Ireland MFC winning team 1987
 Kevin McKernan – All-Ireland Minor Championship 2005, Ulster Under-21 winner 2008

All Stars

Honours
Official honours, with additions noted.

National
All-Ireland Senior Football Championship
 Winners (5): 1960, 1961, 1968, 1991, 1994
 Runners-up (1): 2010
National Football League
 Winners (4): 1959–60, 1961–62, 1967–68, 1982–83
 Runners-up (4): 1962–63, 1963–64, 1969–70, 1989–90
All-Ireland Junior Football Championship
 Winners (1): 1946
All-Ireland Under-21 Football Championship
 Winners (1): 1979
Leo Murphy Cup - U20 Football Development League
 Winners (1): 2019
All-Ireland Minor Football Championship
 Winners (4): 1977, 1987, 1999, 2005

Provincial
Ulster Senior Football Championship
 Winners (12): 1959, 1960, 1961, 1963, 1965, 1966, 1968, 1971, 1978, 1981, 1991, 1994
 Runners-up (15): 1940, 1942, 1958, 1962, 1967, 1969, 1973, 1974, 1975, 1986, 1996, 1999, 2003, 2012, 2017
Ulster Junior Football Championship
 Winners (9): 1931, 1934, 1946, 1947, 1949, 1958, 1965, 1966, 1971
Dr McKenna Cup:
 Winners (11): 1944, 1959, 1961, 1964, 1972, 1987, 1989, 1992, 1996, 1998, 2008
Dr Lagan Cup
 Winners (6): 1949, 1960, 1961, 1962, 1963, 1964
Ulster Under-21 Football Championship
 Winners (9): 1965, 1977, 1978, 1979, 1984, 1985, 2005, 2008, 2009
Ulster Under-20 Football Championship
 Winners (1): 2021
Ulster Minor Football Championship
 Winners (10): 1958, 1960, 1962, 1963, 1966, 1977, 1979, 1986, 1987, 1999

References

 
County football teams